This is a list of members of the Australian Senate from 1 July 1947 to 30 June 1950. Half of its members were elected at the 21 August 1943 election and had terms starting on 1 July 1944 and finishing on 30 June 1947; the other half were elected at the 28 September 1946 election and had terms starting on 1 July 1947 and finishing on 30 June 1953.

All senators elected at the 1943 election and 15 of the 18 elected (representing all states except Queensland) represented the Australian Labor Party, leading to the strongest single party domination in any Australian Senate.  The plurality-at-large voting system used before the 1949 election meant that the winning party (or coalition) ticket usually took all seats in each state.

The Senate was expanded from 36 to 60 seats as a result of legislation passed in 1948. 1949 was the first senate election conducted with a single transferable vote under a proportional voting system. with the new senators taking their seats on 22 February 1950 The membership of the newly expanded Senate broke down as follows:
12 of its members (2 for each state) had terms starting on 22 February 1950 (the day the term of the House of Representatives began) and due to finish on 30 June 1953.
12 of its members (2 for each state) had terms starting on 22 February 1950 (the day the term of the House of Representatives began) and due to finish on 30 June 1956.

While the introduction of new senators decreased the Labor dominance of the senate, Labor retained a Senate majority.

Notes

References

Members of Australian parliaments by term
20th-century Australian politicians
Australian Senate lists